Eliseo, the Spanish form of Elisha, may refer to:

Eliseo Alberto (1951–2011), Cuban-born Mexican writer, novelist, essayist and journalist
Eliseo Castillo (born 1975), professional boxer
Eliseo Grenet (1893–1950), Cuban pianist and a leading composer/arranger
Eliseo Martín (born 1973), Aragonese Spanish long-distance runner
Eliseo Medina (born 1946), labor activist involved in proposals for U.S. national immigration reform
Eliseo Payán (1825–1895), Colombian lawyer, politician, and military officer
Eliseo J. Pérez-Stable, Cuban-American physician-scientist
Eliseo Quintanilla (born 1983), Salvadoran football (soccer) player
Eliseo Rivero (born 1957), former Uruguayan footballer
Eliseo Salazar (born 1954), racing driver from Chile
Eliseo Soriano (1947–2021), current Presiding Minister of the Members Church of God International
Eliseo Subiela (born 1944), Argentine film director and writer
Eliseo Valdés Erutes (born 1956), Cuban artist specializing in sculpture, painting, and drawing
José Eliseo Salamanca (born 1979), Salvadoran professional soccer player

Spanish masculine given names